Płaszczyca  is a village in the administrative district of Gmina Przechlewo, within Człuchów County, Pomeranian Voivodeship, in northern Poland. It is located within the historic region of Pomerania.

The village has a population of 369.

Płaszczyca was a private village within the Polish Crown, administratively located in the Człuchów County in the Pomeranian Voivodeship, owned by the Polish noble family of Ciecholewski in the 16th century. It was annexed by Prussia during the First Partition of Poland in 1772, and from 1871 to 1945 it was also part of Germany, under the name Platzig. During World War II the Germans operated a labor camp for prisoners of war from the Stalag II-B prisoner-of-war camp in the village.

References

Villages in Człuchów County